Yo soy Boricua, pa'que tú lo sepas! is a documentary film co-directed by Liz Garbus and Rosie Perez, in which Perez explores Puerto Rican culture and history, from New York City's Puerto Rican Day Parade to a broader examination of Puerto Rico's past.

See also 
 Yo soy Boricua, pa'que tu lo sepas! (song)

References

External links

2006 films
Puerto Rican films
American documentary films
2006 documentary films
Films directed by Liz Garbus
Documentary films about Puerto Rico
2000s American films